Tout Schuss is a 2016 French comedy film directed by Stéphan Archinard and François Prévôt-Leygonie.

Plot 
Max Salinger, writer divorced, self-centered, refuses to accept his 15-year-old daughter under his roof. In revenge, she steals his last manuscript and got to the snow-class queue. To recover his property, Max then has no choice but to land in the ski resort improvising "accompanying parent." Only problem : the famous writer, which is already not an exemplary parent, is not really a skilled attendant either !

Cast 
 José Garcia as Max Salinger
 Alexia Barlier as Elsa Jay
 Manon Valentin as Rosalie
 François Deblock as Steeve
 Tess Boutmann as Marion
 Gwendolyn Gourvenec as Katherine Barns
 Victor Meutelet as Nathan
 Léopoldine Serre as Isabelle
 Melha Bedia 
 Anne Girouard

References

External links 

2016 comedy films
French comedy films
2016 films
2010s French films